Agatówka  is a village in the administrative district of Gmina Trzydnik Duży, within Kraśnik County, Lublin Voivodeship, in Eastern Poland.

The village has a population of 150.

References

Villages in Kraśnik County